Quchabad-e Mohammad Khan (also Romanized as Qūchābād-e Moḩammad Khān; also known as Ḩoseynābād, Qūchābād, and Qūchābād-e Şamşām) is a village in Nakhlestan Rural District, in the Central District of Kahnuj County, Kerman Province, Iran. At the 2006 census, its population was 298, in 63 families.

References 

Populated places in Kahnuj County